Prasauni Bhatha is a [Bindabasini Rural Municipality Ward No.5] in Parsa District in the Narayani Zone  southern Nepal. At the time of the 1991 Nepal census it had a population of 3917 people living in 618 individual households.

References

Populated places in Parsa District